Prior to the introduction of the Hot 100, The Billboard compiled multiple weekly record charts ranking the performance of singles in the United States. In 1946, the magazine published the following four all-genre national singles charts:

Best-Selling Popular Retail Records – ranked the most-sold singles in retail stores, as reported by merchants surveyed throughout the country. In the 21st century, Billboard designates Retail Records, in all its incarnations, as the magazine's canonical U.S. singles chart prior to August 1958.
Records Most-Played on the Air – ranked the most-played songs on American radio stations, as reported by radio disc jockeys and radio stations.
Most-Played Juke Box Records – ranked the most-played songs in jukeboxes across the United States, as reported by machine operators.
Honor Roll of Hits – a composite ten-position song chart which combined data from the three charts above along with three other component charts. It served as The Billboards lead chart until the introduction of the Hot 100 in 1958 and would remain in print until 1963.

Note: In the issues dated February 9, June 22, and October 12, The Billboard reported a tie for the number-one single on one of its charts.

See also
1946 in music

References

1946
1946 record charts
1946 in American music